Ebenezer Wake Cook (28 December 1843 – 1926), generally referred to as E. Wake Cook, was a watercolour painter.

Cook was born at Maldon, Essex, England and came to Melbourne in 1852. At 17 years of age Cook became an assistant to Nicholas Chevalier, who instructed him in painting, wood-engraving and lithography. During 1867 and 1868 Chevalier was commissioned to produce a number of images of New Zealand and Tasmania and Victoria, Australia, by the Duke of Edinburgh. A watercolour of Isle of the Dead in Tasmania was painted by Cook in about 1868.

He was one of the original members of the Victorian Academy of Arts in 1870. In 1872 Cook studied under Eugene von Guerard at the National Gallery of Victoria. In that year he won the medal for the best water-colour exhibited at the exhibition of the New South Wales Academy of Art.

He was an associate of Tom Roberts, Rupert Bunny and Bertram Mackennal, and for a time worked for the Adelaide Photographic Company.

In 1873 Cook went to London, and from 1875 to 1926 was a constant exhibitor at the Royal Academy. In 1904 he published a pamphlet, Anarchism in Art and Chaos in Criticism, which was followed in 1924 by Retrogression in Art and the Suicide of the Royal Academy, an attack on all un-academic painters from Manet onwards. Cook for a time was president of the Langham Sketch Club, and an original member and honorary secretary of the Royal British Colonial Society of Artists. Cook died early in 1926. His work was popular with some collectors and dealers, but it was often regarded as  pretty when it was meant to be beautiful. Cook is represented in the national galleries at Sydney, Melbourne and Adelaide.

References

Sources

External links
Sale prices of works by Ebenezer Wake Cook
 Watercolour. Isle of the Dead, Tasmania (c. 1868) painted by Ebenezer Wake Cook

1843 births
1926 deaths
19th-century English painters
English male painters
20th-century English painters
English watercolourists
British emigrants to colonial Australia
Australian painters
Australian art critics
19th-century English male artists
20th-century English male artists